Svend Methling (1 October 1891 – 4 June 1977) was a Danish actor and film director.

He was a director for Dansk Skolescene 1924-1929, for Folkescenen  1925 and for Komediehuset 1929-1930. He also worked as a director at the Det Ny Teater between  1926-1929. From 1932 to 1962 he worked as an actor in numerous films often family musical oriented films. During this time he also directed several films but the bulk of his director work on film was in the 1940s. In 1946 he directed The Tinderbox, the first Danish animated feature film, animated by Børge Ring.

Selected filmography as an actor
Der var engang - 1922
Hadda Padda - 1924 
Kirke og orgel - 1932
Champagnegaloppen - 1938
Det store ansvar - 1944
Familien Gelinde - 1944
Den usynlige hær - 1945
Soldaten og Jenny - 1947
Tre år efter - 1948
For frihed og ret - 1949
Berlingske Tidende (film) - 1949
Historien om Hjortholm - 1950
Unge piger forsvinder i København - 1951
Fra den gamle købmandsgård - 1951
Husmandstøsen - 1952
Kærlighedsdoktoren - 1952
 The Crime of Tove Andersen (1953)
 We Who Go the Kitchen Route (1953)
Karen, Maren og Mette - 1954
Bruden fra Dragstrup - 1955
Der kom en dag - 1955
En kvinde er overflødig - 1957
Tre piger fra Jylland - 1957
Ingen tid til kærtegn - 1957
Sømænd og svigermødre - 1962

References

External links

Biography at the Danish Film Institute (Danish)

Danish male film actors
Danish male silent film actors
20th-century Danish male actors
Danish male stage actors
Danish film directors
Danish theatre directors
Danish animated film directors
Danish animators
1891 births
1977 deaths